Cameron Watson may refer to:

 Cameron Watson (actor) (born 1961), American actor, screenwriter, and director
 Cameron Watson (soccer) (born 1987), Australian footballer